The Radios was a Belgian pop band that was founded at the end of the 1980s by singer/songwriter Bart Peeters.

The group scored their greatest hit with "She Goes Nana" in 1992, a song that topped the Belgian hit parade (Ultratop) for 6 weeks. Other hits were "Teardrops", "I'm into folk", "Walking The Thin Line", "She's My Lover" and "Dreaming Wild". The group split in 1994.

Members
 Bart Peeters (singer/guitar)
 Ronny Mosuse (singer/bass)
 Robert Mosuse (singer/percussion)
 Dany Lademacher (guitar/singer)
 Alain Van Zeveren (keyboard/accordion)
 Marc Bonne (drums)

Guest musicians
 Walter Mets (drums)

Discography

No Television (1990)
 Gimme Love
 The One
 Stars of Heaven
 She Talks to the Rain
 Tears in the Morning
 Lucky Day
 Radio
 Swimming in the pool
 I'm into Folk
 Lay Down
 26 Guitars of Love
 Blue Roses

The Sound of Music (1992)
 Think of You
 Because She Said So
 She Goes Nana
 Dreaming Wild
 Walking The Thin Line
 Oh No!
 Sleeples Nights
 She's My Lover (She's My Friend)
 Devil in My Cheekbone
 S.O.S. To An Angel
 Bang Bang
 In The Nighttime

Live (1993)
 Pop Stands Up
 Lucky Day
 Oh No!
 Walking The Thin Line
 Devil in My Cheekbone
 Sleepless Nights
 Gimme Love
 Swimming in the Pool (incl. On My Radio)
 Back To Boystown
 She's My Lover (She's My Friend)
 Dreaming Wild
 Does Your Mother Know
 She Goes Nana
 I Wish
 I'm into Folk
 Non, Non, Rien N'a Changé
 S.O.S. To An Angel (The Forbidden Word Version) (Bonus-record on special edition)

Baby Yes! (1994)
 I wanna hold your hand
 If the sun
 Move it right now
 Mystery mountains
 Baby yes!
 Teardrops
 Sad world
 Miracle man
 The fiddler
 Cinderella sometimes
 Wild planet
 Sweet kisses

The Best Of (1997)
 She goes nana
 Gimme love
 I'm into folk
 Swimming in the pool
 Lucky day (live)
 Non,non,rien n'a change (live)
 Tears in the morning
 Dreaming wild
 SOS to an angel
 Walking the thin line
 Oh no (live)
 Teardrops
 Cinderella sometimes
 Move it right now
 Because she said so
 Devil in my cheekbone
 If the sun
 She's my lover (she's my friend) (live)

References

External links
 The Radios in the Belgian Ultratop

Belgian pop music groups
Belgian rock music groups
Musical groups established in 1989
Musical groups disestablished in 1994